The Provo East Central Historic District is a  historic district in Provo, Utah, United States that was listed on the National Register of Historic Places in 1998.

Description
The district It is roughly bounded by 100 East, 500 North, 600 East, and 500 South and includes examples of Bungalow/Craftsman, Prairie School, and Late Victorian architecture among its 599 contributing buildings. The majority of its buildings were constructed between 1900 and 1925.

The Charles E. Loose House is a contributing property in the district.

See also

 National Register of Historic Places listings in Utah County, Utah
 Provo Downtown Historic District

References

External links

Historic districts in Utah County, Utah
Prairie School architecture in Utah
Victorian architecture in Utah
Historic districts on the National Register of Historic Places in Utah
National Register of Historic Places in Provo, Utah